In computer science, interactive computation is a mathematical model for computation that involves input/output communication with the external world during computation.

Uses

Among the currently studied mathematical models of computation that attempt to capture interaction are Giorgi Japaridze's hard- and easy-play machines elaborated within the framework of computability logic, Dina Q. Goldin's Persistent Turing Machines (PTMs), and Yuri Gurevich's abstract state machines. Peter Wegner has additionally done a great deal of work on this area of computer science .

See also
Cirquent calculus
Computability logic
Game semantics
Human-based computation
Hypercomputation
Interactive programming
Membrane computing
Quasi-empiricism
RE (complexity)
Super-recursive algorithm

References

Interactive Computation: The New Paradigm . Edited by D. Goldin, S. Smolka and P. Wegner. Springer, 2006.
 D. Goldin, Persistent Turing Machines as a model of interactive computation. Lecture Notes in Computer Science 1762, pp. 116-135.
 D. Goldin, S. Smolka, P. Attie, E. Sonderegger, Turing Machines, Transition Systems, and Interaction. J. Information and Computation 194:2 (2004), pp. 101-128
 P. Wegner, Interactive foundations of computing.  Theoretical Computer Science 192 (1998), pp. 315-351.

External links

Abstract State Machines OUT DATED 2009
[https://en.wikipedia.org/wiki/Abstract_state_machine }

Theory of computation
Theoretical computer science